Uíge, formerly Carmona, is a provincial capital city in northwestern Angola, with a population of 322,531 (2014 census), and a municipality, with a population of 519,196 (2014 census), located in the province of the same name. It grew from a small market centre in 1945 to become a city in 1956.

Name
Uíge was renamed Vila Marechal Carmona in 1955 after the former Portuguese President Óscar Carmona, renamed simply Carmona after it became a city, but changed back to Uíge in 1975.

History
During Portuguese occupation it was a major center for coffee production in the 1950s. The city was the nerve center of rebel activity against Portuguese occupation. Consequently, the city faced frequent guerrilla war between Portuguese forces and the National Front for the Liberation of Angola (Frente Nacional de Libertação de Angola; FNLA).

It had the worst known ever outbreak of the Marburg virus in 2005.

Demographics
In 2010 it had a population of 119,815. In 2014 the population was 322,531.  Projected to be the fourth fastest growing city  on the African continent between 2020 and 2025, with a 5.92% growth.

References

Provincial capitals in Angola
Populated places in Uíge Province
Municipalities of Angola